HMS Tempest was the name of two Royal Navy warships:

She was launched in January 1917 and scrapped in January 1937.
  was a T-class submarine. She launched in June 1941 and was sunk by an Italian torpedo boat in February 1942.

Royal Navy ship names